Saskatchewan Highway 693 is a highway in the north central region of the Canadian province of Saskatchewan. It connects the Highway 3/ Highway 55 concurrency near Shellbrook to Highway 240 in Prince Albert National Park.

Communities 
Sturgeon Lake Indian Reserve No. 101 is located east of Highway 693. The reserve extends from its western boundary at Highway 693, and its eastern boundary is on the shoreline of Sturgeon Lake.

Travel route 
Highway 693 begins at the junction of the concurrency of Highway 55 and Highway 3 near Shellbrook in the Rural Municipality of Shellbrook No. 493 and extends north  to Highway 240 in the Prince Albert National Park. At km 0.0, travel on Highway 693 is north. At km 17.8, Highway 693 turns east. At km 18.6, it returns northward travelling along the western edge of Sturgeon Lake Indian Reserve. Highway 693 continues north until Km 21.8 when it turns west departing from the western boundary of the Indian reserve. At Km 24.4 Highway 693 travels north. At Km 41.9 the highway returns to its northern routing. At Km 43.3, there is a turn in a north-east direction. The final mile post is Km 44.2 when Highway 693 connects with the terminal junction at Highway 240 in the Prince Albert National Park.

Intersections

See also 
Roads in Saskatchewan
Transportation in Saskatchewan

References 

693